"When Will I Be Famous?" is a song by British boy band Bros. Written by Nicky Graham and Tom Watkins, "When Will I Be Famous?" was released as a single in November 1987. The following year, it peaked at number two on the UK Singles Chart, topped the Irish Singles Chart, and entered the top five in several other countries. "When Will I Be Famous?" would later appear on Bros' 1988 album, Push.

Rolling Stone ranked the song at number 72 on their list of the "75 Greatest Boy Band Songs of All Time" in 2020. In 2017, ShortLists Dave Fawbert listed this song at number one on his list of the "Greatest Key Changes in Music History".

Chart performance
"When Will I Be Famous?" was a number-one single in Ireland, as well as reaching number two in the United Kingdom, Denmark, Norway and Switzerland. It entered the UK Singles Chart on 28 November 1987 at number 81, in an initial five-week chart run until the end of December. It re-entered the top 100 at number 51 on the week ending 3 January 1988, reaching number two four weeks later.

Track listings
UK and US 7-inch single, Japanese mini-CD single
 "When Will I Be Famous?"
 "Love to Hate You"

UK 12-inch single and European mini-CD single
 "When Will I Be Famous?" (the Infamous mix)
 "When Will I Be Famous?" (the Contender dub mix)
 "Love to Hate You"

US 12-inch single
 "When Will I Be Famous?" (club mix) – 8:02
 "When Will I Be Famous?" (acapella mix) – 4:06
 "When Will I Be Famous?" (7-inch version) – 3:59
 "When Will I Be Famous?" (dub mix) – 7:35
 "When Will I Be Famous?" (bonus beats) – 2:53

Japanese CD mini-album
 "When Will I Be Famous?"
 "When Will I Be Famous?" (Infamous mix)
 "When Will I Be Famous?" (the Contender dub mix)

Charts

Weekly charts

Year-end charts

Release history

References

External links
 

1987 singles
1987 songs
Bros (British band) songs
CBS Records singles
Epic Records singles
Irish Singles Chart number-one singles
Music videos directed by Andy Morahan
Song recordings produced by Nicky Graham
Songs about fame
Songs written by Nicky Graham
Songs written by Tom Watkins (music manager)